Helicophanta is a genus of air-breathing land snails, a terrestrial pulmonate gastropods mollusks in the family Acavidae.

Species 
Species within the genus Helicophanta include:
 Helicophanta amphibulima
 Helicophanta betsiloensis
 Helicophanta bicingulata
 Helicophanta falconeri
 Helicophanta farafanga
 Helicophanta geayi
 Helicophanta gloriosa
 Helicophanta goudotiana
 Helicophanta guesteriana
 Helicophanta ibaraoensis
 Helicophanta magnifica
 Helicophanta oviformis
 Helicophanta petiti
 Helicophanta socii
 Helicophanta souverbiana
 Helicophanta vesicalis

References

Acavidae